Franco Fortini was the pseudonym of Franco Lattes (10 September 1917 – 28 November 1994), an Italian poet, writer, translator, essayist, literary critic and Marxist intellectual.

Life 
Franco Fortini was born in Florence, the son of a Jewish lawyer, Dino Lattes, and a Catholic mother, Emma Fortini Del Giglio. He studied law and humanities at the University. In 1939 he joined the Protestant church, but in his late years he described himself as an atheist. In 1940 he adopted his mother's last name to avoid racial persecution. In 1941 he joined the Italian army as an officer. After September 8, 1943, he sought refuge in Switzerland (where he met European intellectuals, politicians and critics), then in 1944 he returned to fight with the partisans in Valdossola.

When the war was over he settled in Milan, working as journalist, copywriter and translator. He was one of the editorial board members of the magazine Il Politecnico.

Soon after the Russian invasion of Hungary in 1956, Fortini left the Italian Socialist Party which he had joined in 1944.
From 1964 to 1972 he taught in secondary schools, and from 1976 occupied the Chair of Literary Criticism at the University of Siena. During this period he had considerable influence on younger generations in search of social and intellectual change. He was considered one of the most important intellectuals of the Italian New Left.  He died in Milan.

He was associated with some of the most important European writers and intellectuals, such as Sartre, Brecht, Barthes and Lukács.

Fortini translated works by Goethe, Brecht, Simone Weil, Milton, Proust, Kafka, Éluard, Frénaud, Flaubert, Gide and many others.

Bibliography (in English)
 Poems (parallel text, in Italian & English. Translated by Michael Hamburger) Arc Publications, Todmorden 1978 – 
 Summer is not all. Selected poems (in Italian and English. Translated by Paul Lawton), Carcanet, Manchester 1992 – 
 The Dogs of the Sinai (Translated by Alberto Toscana), Seagull Books, London 2013 – 
 A Test of Powers: Writings on Criticism and Literary Institutions (Translated by Alberto Toscano), Seagull Books, London 2016 –

Bibliography (in Italian)
Fogli di via e altri versi (Marching Orders and other poems), Einaudi, Torino, 1946
Agonia di Natale (Christmas agony), Einaudi, Torino 1948
Sei poesie per Ruth e una per me, tipografia Lucini, Milano 1953
Una facile allegoria (A simple allegory), Edizioni della Meridiana, Milano 1954
In una strada di Firenze (On a Florentine street), Edizioni Linea grafiche, Milano 1955
Asia maggiore. Viaggio nella Cina (Asia major. A journey in China), Einaudi, Torino 1956
I destini generali (General destinies), S. Sciascia, Caltanissetta-Roma 1956
Dieci inverni (1947–1957) Contributi ad un discorso socialista (Ten winters 1947–1957. Contributions to a socialist discours), Feltrinelli, Milano 1957
Sestina a Firenze, Schwarz, Milano 1959
Il movimento surrealista (The surrealist movement), Garzanti, Milano 1959
Poesia e errore (Poetry and error), Mondadori, Milano 1969
Poesia delle rose (The poems of the roses), Libreria Antiquaria Palmaverde, Bologna 1962
Sere in Valdossola (Evenings in Valdossola), Mondadori, Milano 1963
Tre testi per film (Three texts for films), Edizioni Avanti!, Milano 1963
Una volta per sempre (Once and for all), Mondadori, Milano 1963
Profezie e realtà del nostro secolo. Testi e documenti per la storia di domani (Prophecies and realities of our century. Texts and documents for tomorrow's history), Laterza, Bari 1965
Verifica dei poteri. Scritti di critica e di istituzioni letterarie (Verifications of the powers), Il Saggiatore, Milano 1965
L'ospite ingrato. Testi e note per versi ironici (The ungrateful guest. Texts and notes towards ironic verse), De Donato, Bari 1966
I cani del Sinai (The dogs of Sinai), De Donato, Bari 1967
Ventiquattro voci per un dizionario di lettere. Breve guida a un buon uso dell'alfabeto, (Twenty-four entries for a dictionary of letters), Il Saggiatore, Milano 1968
Ventiquattro poesie 1961–1968(Twenty-four poems 1961–1968), S.I.E.(1969)
Questo muro (This wall), Mondadori, Milano 1973
Saggi italiani (Italian essays), De Donato Bari 1974
La poesia di Scotellaro (Scotellaro's poetry), Basilicata, Roma 1974
Poesie scelte (1938–1973) (Selected poems) ed. Pier Vincenzo Mangaldo, Oscar Mondadori, Milano 1974
I poeti del Novecento (The poets of Twentieth century), Laterza, Bari 1977
Questioni di frontiera. Scritti di politica e di letteratura 1965– 1977 (Lines of demarcation), Einaudi, Torino 1977
Una volta per sempre (Foglio di via – Poesia e errore – Una volta per sempre – Questo muro) Poesie 1938–1973, Einaudi, Torino 1978
Una obbedienza (An obedience), introd. by Andrea Zanzotto, S.Marco dei Giustiniani, Genova 1980
Il ladro di ciliegie e altre versioni di poesia, Einaudi, Torino 1982
Memorie per dopodomani. Tre scritti 1945 1967 e 1980(Memories for beyond tomorrow), ed. Carlo Fini, Quaderni di Barbablù, Siena 1984
Paesaggio con serpente. Versi 19783-1983 (Landscape with serpent), Einaudi, Torino 1984
Inesistenze.Cinquanta scritti 1976–1984 (Insistences), Garzanti, Milano 1985
Dei confini della poesia (On the boundaries of poetry), Edizioni l'Obliquo, Brescia 1986
La poesia ad alta voce (Poetry out loud),ed. Carlo Fini, Taccuini di Barbablù, Siena 1986
Note su Giacomo Noventa (Notes on Giacomo Noventa), Marsilio, Venezia 1986
Nuovi Saggi italiani 2 (New Italian essays 2), Garzanti, Milano 1987
Versi primi e distanti 1937–1957, All'insegna del pesce d'oro, Milano 1987
La cena delle ceneri & Racconto fiorentino (Ash-Wednesday supper & Florentine story), pref. by Mario Spinella, Claudio Lombardi Editore, Milano 1988
La morte del cherubino. Racconto 1938, ed. Carlo Fini, Taccuini di Barbablù, Siena 1988
Extrema ratio. Note per un buon uso delle rovine (Extreme reason. Notes for a good use of the ruins), Garzanti, Milano 1990
Versi scelti 1939–1989 (Selected verse 1939–1989), Einaudi, Torino 1990
Diario tedesco 1949 (Germany diary), Piero Manni, Lecce 1991
Non solo oggi. Cinquantanove voci (Not just today), ed. Paolo Jachia, Editori Riuniti, Roma 1991
Attraverso Pasolini (Through Pasolini), Einaudi, Torino 1993
Composita solvantur  (Loose works), Einaudi, Torino 1994

Posthumous
Poesie inedite (Unpublished poems), ed. P.V. Mengaldo, Einaudi, Torino 1995
Trentasei moderni. Breve secondo Novecento, pref. by Romano Luperini, Manni, Lecce 1996
Disobbedienze 1. Gli anni della sconfitta. Scritti sul Manifesto 1985–1994, pref. by Rossanna Rossanda, manifestolibri, Roma 1997
Dialoghi con Tasso, ed. Pier Vincenzo Mengaldo and Donatello Santarone, Bollati Boringhieri, Torino 1998
Dissobedienze II. Gli anni dei movimenti. Scritti sul Manifesto 1972–1985, manifestolibri, Roma 1988
Franchi dialoghi, F. Fortini – F. Loi, Manni, Lecce 1998
Il dolore della verità: Maggiani incontra Fortini, ed. Erminio Risso, Manni, Lecce 2000
Le rose dell'abisso, ed. Donatello Santarone, Bollati Boringhieri, Torino 2000
Disegni Incisioni Dipinti. Catalogo ragionato della produzione pittorica e grafica di Franco Fortini, ed. Enrico Crispolti, Quodlibet, Macerata 2001
I cani del Sinai, Quodlibet, Macerata 2002
Saggi ed epigrammi, ed. Luca Lenzini pref. by Rossana Rossanda, Mondadori, Milano 2003
Un dialogo ininterrotto. Interviste 1952–1994, ed. Velio Abati, Bollati Boringhieri, Torino 2003
Un giorno o l'altro, Quodlibet, Macerata 2006
La guerra a Milano. Estate 1943. Edizione critica e commento a cura di Alessandro La Monica, Pisa, Pacini Editore, 2017.

Secondary literature (in English)

Secondary literature (in Italian)
A Berardinelli, Franco Fortini, La Nuova Italia, Firenze 1973.
P. Sabbatino, Gli inverni di Fortini. Il rischio dell'errore nella cultura e nella poesia, Bastogni, Foggia 1982.
R. Luperini, La lotta mentale. Per un profilo di Franco Fortini. Editori Riuniti, Roma 1986.
R. Pagnanelli, Fortini, Transeuropa, Ancona 1988
Paolo Jachia – Luca Lenzini – Pia Mondelli (a c. di), Bibliografia degli scritti di Franco Fortini (1935–1991), Firenze, Le Monnier, 1989.
 T.E. Peterson,  The Ethical Muse of Franco Fortini, University Press of Florida, Gainesville 1997.
L. Lenzini, Il poeta di nome Fortini. Saggi e proposte di lettura, Manni, Lecce 1999.
Elisabetta Nencini, "L'Archivio Franco Fortini della Facoltà di Lettere dell'Università di Siena", in Raffaella Castagnola (a c. di), Archivi letterari del '900, Firenze, Franco Cesati, 2000, pp. 13–116.
 E. Passannanti (a cura di), "Realtà e paradosso della traduzione poetica, Istituto di Studi Filosofici, 2004.
 E. Passannanti, Scrittura saggistica, linguaggio lirico e traduzione poetica nell'opera di Franco Fortini (Tesi di PhD), Brindin Press, Salisbury 2004.
E. Passannanti, Poem of the Roses. Linguistic Expressionism in the Poetry of Franco Fortini, Series Transference, Troubador, Leicester, 2004.
D. Balicco, Non parlo a tutti. Franco Fortini intellettuale e politico, Manifestolibri, Roma 2006.
 E. Passannanti, "Senso e semiotica in Paesaggio con serpente di Franco Fortini", Brindin Press, Salisbury 2011.
 Luca Lenzini,Elisabetta Nencini, Felice Rappazzo, Dieci inverni senza Fortini. Poeti e critici a confronto, Siena 14–16 ottobre 2004, Atti delle giornate di studio nel decennale della scomparsa, Quodlibet 2006.Con contributi di Giuseppe Nava, Mario Luzi, Franco Loi, Andrea Zanzotto, Jean-Charles Vegliante, Stefano Dal Bianco, Massimo Raffaeli, Gianni D'Elia, Pietro Cataldi, Andrea Inglese, Davide Dalmas, Thomas Peterson, Giovanni La Guardia Ausgrenzung, Guido Mazzoni, Mario Benedetti, Emanuele Zinato, Valentina Tinacci, Giacomo Magrini, Andrea Cortellessa, Gabriele Frasca, Riccardo Bonavita, Cristina Alziati, Erminia Passannanti, Fabrizio Podda, Enrica Zanin, Giovanni Solinas.
 E. Passannanti, Commentario a Realtà e paradosso della traduzione poetica di Franco Fortini. Excursus sulle teorie della traduzione del testo poetico, Brindin Press, 2004, sec, ed. 2008.
 E. Passannanti, La partenza. Saggio di analisi testuale, Premio Franco Fortini per la Saggistica, Sondrio: CFR Edizioni, 2011.

References

External links 
L'ospite ingrato. Rivista on line del Centro Studi Franco Fortini

 Poems by Franco Fortini
 about Franco Fortini

Italian male poets
1917 births
1994 deaths
Italian socialists
Writers from Florence
20th-century Italian translators
20th-century Italian poets
20th-century Italian male writers